Anne-Marie Lizin-Vanderspeeten (5 January 1949 – 17 October 2015) was a Belgian politician, who served as the President of the Senate of Belgium from 2004 to 2007.

Political career
She served on the city council of Huy in 1977 and was an alderman for Huy from 1980–82. In 1983, she was appointed mayor of Huy, holding this position for 26 years. In March 2009 she was forced to resign because of a series of scandals. She was succeeded by Micheline Toussaint.

In 1979, Lizin was elected as an elected Member of the European Parliament. In 1988, she was elected into the Belgian government, and served in office for eight years. During her first term, she was appointed as Secretary of State for European Affairs, yet she decided to leave this role in 1992 to initiate the Commission of Inquiry on human trafficking. In 2003, she became President of the Commission for External Relations and Defence of the Belgian Senate; In 2004, she was appointed President of the Senate of Belgium, before finally becoming Senator in July 2007. She was the first female President of the Belgian Senate (2004–07). On 27 January 2009 she was banned from the Socialist party after a corruption case. Outside of her career in Belgian politics, Lizin was the United Nations Independent Expert on Human Rights and Extreme Poverty from 1998 to 2004.

Court trial
In March 2015 she was convicted in appeals court in Liège for electoral malpractice. She had appealed the conviction to the Supreme Court.

Philanthropy

Lizin was a member of the Board of Directors of the International Centre for Missing & Exploited Children (ICMEC), a global nonprofit organization that combats child sexual exploitation, child pornography, and child abduction.

In 2008, she created the organisation HOCRINT, an international co-ordination network that fight against honor crimes and forced marriages. She played an active role for the End Human Trafficking Now (EHTN) organisation, in which she sat on the board till her death.

Publications
During her time in politics, Lizin released many publications, her most famous include, Women of Europe and the Third World, what solidarity? (1983) Social Democracy Tomorrow (1990) and Kosovo Independence Inevitable (1997).

Political interests
Lizin was widely acclaimed for her devotion to tackling human rights issues. Of particular importance to her were the rights of women across the globe and the need to eradicate human trafficking.

Death
Lizin was hospitalized in Paris on 7 October 2015. A few days after being released from hospital in Paris, she died in Hotel Fort at Huy in Belgium on 17 October 2015 at the age of 66.

Honours 
 2003: Commander in the Order of Leopold.
 2007 : Knight Grand cross in the Order of Leopold II.
 : 1st class - Grand Cross of the Order of Merit of the Republic of Poland.

References

External links

Anne-Marie Lizin (Senate)

1949 births
2015 deaths
Belgian activists
Belgian women activists
Belgian political writers
Belgian socialists
Children's rights activists
MEPs for Belgium 1979–1984
MEPs for Belgium 1984–1989
20th-century women MEPs for Belgium
Mayors of places in Belgium
Members of the Chamber of Representatives (Belgium)
Members of the Senate (Belgium)
Socialist Party (Belgium) MEPs
People from Huy
Presidents of the Senate (Belgium)
University of Liège alumni
Walloon people
Women mayors of places in Belgium
Trials in Belgium
Recipients of the Grand Cross of the Order of Leopold II
Grand Crosses of the Order of Merit of the Republic of Poland
United Nations special rapporteurs
Women legislative speakers
Women members of the Senate (Belgium)
Belgian officials of the United Nations